Cottonville is an unincorporated community in Marshall County, Alabama, United States.

Notes

Unincorporated communities in Marshall County, Alabama
Unincorporated communities in Alabama